Frauenkirche (Church of Our Lady) is a common dedication for churches in German-speaking countries, and may refer to:
 Frauenkirche, Dresden, a Protestant church in Dresden, Germany
 Frauenkirche, Munich, the Catholic cathedral in Munich, Germany
 Frauenkirche, Nuremberg, a Catholic church in Nuremberg, Germany

See also
 Church of Our Lady (disambiguation)
 Liebfrauenkirche (disambiguation)